The Obô Natural Park of Príncipe is a natural park of São Tomé and Príncipe, covering 85 km² of the island of Príncipe. It was established in 2006.

Flora and fauna
On Príncipe island, fauna includes a frog known as Phrynobatrachus dispar, birds such as Dohrn's thrush-babbler  (Horizorhinus dohrni), the Príncipe kingfisher, Principe starling and the Príncipe thrush (Turdus xanthorhynchus), and the grey parrot (Psittacus erithacus), and a moth such as Agrotera albalis.

References

National parks of São Tomé and Príncipe
Príncipe
2006 establishments in São Tomé and Príncipe